Lulworth Abbey was a Trappist monastery at East Lulworth in Dorset, England, established as a priory in 1796 by Thomas Weld for refugee French Trappist monks moving on from temporary shelter in the abandoned La Valsainte Charterhouse in Switzerland. The monastery at Lulworth was raised to the status of an abbey in 1813 by Pope Pius VII. In 1817 it was abandoned, as the monks were able to return to France, to the newly-re-established Melleray Abbey near Nantes.

References

Further reading
D.A Bellenger: The French Revolution and the Religious Orders. Three Communities 1789–1815, The Downside Review, 1980, p. 26
 J. Berkeley: Lulworth and the Welds. Gillingham, 1971, pp. 143–208 Google Scholar.
George Oliver: Collections, illustrating the history of the Catholic religion (&c), 1857
C.E. Robinson: A Royal Warren; or Picturesque Rambles in the Isle of Purbeck, with etchings by Alfred Dawson. London: The Typographical Etching Company, 1882

Monasteries in Dorset
Trappist monasteries in the United Kingdom